Including players from the Cronulla-Sutherland Sharks that have represented while at the club and the years they  achieved their honours, if known. Representatives from the Cronulla-Sutherland Cobras are included as they are a feeder club.

International

Australia
    Ron Turner (1970, 1974)
    Ken Maddison (1973)
    Greg Pierce (1973, 1975, 1977–78)
    David Waite (1974)
    Steve Rogers (1975, 1978–79, 1981–82)
    Steve Kneen (1978)
    Andrew Ettingshausen (1988, 1990–94)
    Gavin Miller (1988)
    Mark McGaw (1988, 1990)
    Dan Stains (1989)
    Aaron Raper (1995)
    Mat Rogers (1998–2000)
    Russell Richardson (1999)
    Jason Stevens (1999-02)
    Chris McKenna (2000, 2002)
    Brett Kimmorley (2002–05)
    Phil Bailey (2003)
    Greg Bird (2007–08)
    Paul Gallen (2008–14)
    Kade Snowden (2011)
    Luke Lewis (2013, 2015)
    Andrew Fifita (2013, 2017)
    James Maloney (2016)
    Valentine Holmes (2016–18)
    Wade Graham (2017, 2019)
    Aaron Woods (2018)

Australia (SL)
    Andrew Ettingshausen (1997)
    Russell Richardson (1997)
    Jason Stevens (1997)
    Paul Green (1997)
    Craig Greenhill (1997)
    David Peachey (1997)

Cook Islands
   Tyrone Viiga (2013)
   Rea Pittman (2013)

England
    Jeff Grayshon (1977)
    David Eckersley (1977)
    Chris Heighington (2017)

Fiji
    Jayson Bukuya (2008, 2013, 2015, 2019)
    James Storer (2008)
    Junior Roqica (2014)
    Isaac Lumelume (2019)

Great Britain
    Tommy Bishop (1969)
    Mike Gregory (1987)

Greece
    Billy Magoulias (2019)

Italy
    Shannon Donato (1999)
    Paul Franze (2004)
    Andrew Dallalana (2004)
    Jayden Walker (2016)

Lebanon
    Hassan Saleh (2004)

New Zealand
    Dane Sorensen (1977, 1979, 1983, 1985)
    Kurt Sorensen (1983, 1985)
    Richard Barnett (1995–97)
    Tawera Nikau (1997)
    Nigel Vagana (2004–06)
    Luke Covell (2007)
    Gerard Beale (2016–17)
    Shaun Johnson (2019)
    Briton Nikora (2019)
    Braden Hamlin-Uele (2019)
    Ronaldo Mulitalo (2022)

Papua New Guinea
    Paul Aiton (2010)
    James Segeyaro (2017–18)

Portugal
    Isaac De Gois (2007)

Samoa
    Brian Laumatia (1995)
    Hutch Maiava (2006)
    Phillip Leuluai (2007)
    Terence Seu Seu (2008–09)
    Misi Taulapapa (2008–09)
    Jack Afamasaga (2009)
    Mark Taufua (2013)
    Sam Tagataese (2013–14, 2016–17)
    Matthew Wright (2013)
    Penani Manumalealii (2013–14)
    Ricky Leutele (2014–16)
    Fa'amanu Brown (2016–17)
    Joseph Paulo (2017–18)
    Ronaldo Mulitalo (2019)

Tonga
    Fraser Anderson (2008)
    Sam Moa (2008)
    Eddie Paea (2009)
    Atelea Vea (2009)
    Siosaia Vave (2010)
    Sosaia Feki (2013, 2015)
    Pat Politoni (2013, 2015)
    Anthony Tupou (2013)
    David Fifita (2015)
    Tony Williams (2017)
    Andrew Fifita (2017–19)
    Sione Katoa (2019, 2022)

United States
    Ronaldo Mulitalo (2019)

Wales
    Allan Bateman (1995)
    Tyson Frizell (2011)

State of Origin

New South Wales
    Steve Rogers (1980–82)
    Gavin Miller (1983, 1989)
    Andrew Ettingshausen (1987–94, 1996, 1998)
    Mark McGaw (1987–88, 1990–91)
    Jonathan Docking (1987–88)
    Alan Wilson (1989)
    Jason Stevens (2000–01, 2004)
    David Peachey (2000)
    Phil Bailey (2003)
    Brett Kimmorley (2005, 2007)
    Paul Gallen (2006–16)
    Greg Bird (2007–08)
    Trent Barrett (2009–10)
    Kade Snowden (2010–11)
    Todd Carney (2012)
    Andrew Fifita (2013, 2015–17)
    Luke Lewis (2013–14)
    Michael Ennis (2015)
    James Maloney (2016–17)
    Jack Bird (2016–17)
    Wade Graham (2016–17, 2019)
    Matt Prior (2017)
    Josh Morris (2019)
    Siosifa Talakai (2022)

New South Wales (SL)
    Andrew Ettingshausen (1997)
    David Peachey (1997)
    Danny Lee (1997)
    Sean Ryan (1997)

Queensland
    Paul Khan (1981)
    Dan Stains (1989–90)
    Craig Greenhill (1996)
    Martin Lang (1998-00)
    Mat Rogers (1999-00)
    Chris McKenna (1999-00, 2002)
    Chris Beattie (2001–02)
    Danny Nutley (2005)
    Valentine Holmes (2017–18)

Queensland (SL)
    Mat Rogers (1997)
    Chris McKenna (1997)
    Paul Green (1997)
    Craig Greenhill (1997)

All Stars Match

Indigenous All Stars
    Blake Ferguson (2010)
    Andrew Fifita (2012–17, 2019, 2021-22)
    Ben Barba (2015–16)
    Wade Graham (2016–17, 2020)
    David Fifita (2016)
    Jack Bird (2017)
    Jesse Ramien (2020-22)
    Nicho Hynes (2022)
    William Kennedy (2022)
    Braydon Trindall (2022)

NRL All Stars/World All Stars
    Anthony Tupou (2010)
    Paul Gallen (2011–12, 2015)
    Chris Heighington (2013)
    Michael Ennis (2016)

Māori All Stars
    Briton Nikora (2020, 2022)
    Royce Hunt (2022)

City vs Country Origin

NSW City
    Jonathan Docking (1987–89)
    Andrew Ettingshausen (1990–91, 1996)
    Mark McGaw (1992)
    Adam Ritson (1995)
    Colin Best (2001)
    Adam Dykes (2001)
    Nick Graham  (2002)
    Jason Stevens (2003–05)
    Paul Gallen (2006, 2017)
    Lance Thompson (2006–07)
    David Simmons (2006)
    Ben Pomeroy (2007–09)
    Reece Williams (2007)
    Andrew Fifita (2013–15)
    Wade Graham (2013, 2015)
    Michael Lichaa (2014)
    Chad Townsend (2016–17)
    Joseph Paulo (2017)

NSW Country
    Gavin Miller (1989)
    Nick Graham (2002)
    David Peachey (2003)
    Brett Kimmorley (2004, 2007)
    Luke Covell (2005)
    Danny Lee (2006)
    Greg Bird (2007)
    Brett Kearney (2008)
    Anthony Tupou (2009)
    Kade Snowden (2010)
    Jack Bird (2015–16)
    Matt Prior (2017)

Other honours

Prime Minister's XIII
    Paul Gallen (2006–07)
    Greg Bird (2007)
    Ben Pomeroy (2007)
    Luke Douglas (2007, 2010–11)
    Kade Snowden (2010)
    Wade Graham (2012, 2017, 2019)
    Nathan Stapleton (2012)
    Valentine Holmes (2017)
    Jack Bird (2017)
    James Maloney (2017)
    Andrew Fifita (2017)
    Jesse Ramien (2018)
    Aaron Woods (2018)
    Matt Prior (2018)
    Chad Townsend (2018)

New Zealand Māori
    Chance Bunce (2008)

Representative Captains

Test captains
Australia
    Greg Pierce (1978)
    Steve Rogers (1981)

Great Britain
    Tommy Bishop (1969)

Papua New Guinea
    James Segeyaro (2018)

Origin captains
New South Wales
    Steve Rogers (1981)
    Trent Barrett (2010) (Game 3)
    Paul Gallen (2011–16)

City vs Country Origin captains
New South Wales City
    Paul Gallen (2017)

Prime Minister's XIII captains
    Wade Graham (2019)

Representative Coaching Staff

International
Australia
    John Lang (Coach - 1997)
    Chris Anderson (Coach - 2002–03)
    Ricky Stuart (Coach - 2007–08)

Australia (SL)
    John Lang (Coach - 1997)

See also

References

Representatives
Rugby league representative players lists
National Rugby League lists
Sydney-sport-related lists